Lisa Chaffey (born 16 January 1971)  is an Australian wheelchair basketball player. She was born in Geelong, Victoria.  She was part of the silver medal-winning Australia women's national wheelchair basketball team at the 2004 Summer Paralympics. 

Caffey is a qualified occupational therapist with a BOccTher(Hons) and a Doctor of Clinical Science ClinScD.  Her academic profile is on Research Gate https://www.researchgate.net/profile/Lisa-Chaffey    She is the founder of Equipped for Action (occupational therapy for sport and recreation). http://www.lisachaffey.com.au/

References

Paralympic wheelchair basketball players of Australia
Paralympic silver medalists for Australia
Wheelchair category Paralympic competitors
Wheelchair basketball players at the 2004 Summer Paralympics
Sportspeople from Geelong
Living people
Medalists at the 2004 Summer Paralympics
1971 births
Paralympic medalists in wheelchair basketball
Occupational therapists